Aleksandr Pavlovich Orekhov (born 24 May 2002) is a Russian football player. He plays for FC Torpedo Moscow and FC Torpedo-2.

Club career
He made his debut in the Russian Professional Football League for FC Torpedo Moscow on 12 May 2019 in a game against FC Rotor-2 Volgograd. 

He made his Russian Football National League debut for FC Torpedo Moscow on 14 September 2019 in a game against FC Krasnodar-2.

Honours
Torpedo Moscow
 Russian Football National League : 2021-22

Career statistics

References

External links
 Profile by Football National League

2002 births
Footballers from Moscow
Living people
Russian footballers
Association football midfielders
FC Torpedo Moscow players
FC Torpedo-2 players
Russian Second League players
Russian First League players